Longwave are parts of the radio spectrum with relatively long wavelengths.

Longwave or Long Wave may also refer to:

Science and technology
 Outgoing longwave radiation, associated with the energy emitted from a planetary body
 Thermal radiation, when generated by the motion of relatively low-temperature particles
 Long wave macrotexture, a road characteristic

Arts and entertainment
 Longwave (band), a rock band 
 Long Wave, a Jeff Lynne album
 Longwave (film), a 2013 French-language Swiss-French-Portuguese film, original title Les Grandes Ondes (à l'ouest)

Other uses
 Kondratiev wave, hypothesized cycle-like phenomena in economics